The Ainsworth Psalter was written by English Separatist clergyman Henry Ainsworth and was brought to America by the Pilgrims in 1620. It was published in Holland in 1612. It is a parallel translation, including a literal rendering of the Psalms and an accompanying metrical Psalms.

References

Psalters
1612 books